The Suba (Abasuba) are a heterogeneous Bantu group of people in Kenya with an amalgamation of clans drawn from their main tribes Ganda people, Luhya people, and Soga who speak the Suba language that is closely similar to the Ganda language spare some lexical items borrowed from [[Luo. Their population is estimated at 157,787, with substantial fluent speakers. They migrated to Kenya from Uganda and settled on the two Lake Victoria islands of Rusinga and Mfangano, others also settled on the mainland areas including Gembe, Gwassi, Kaksingri of Suba South and Migori and are believed to be the last tribe to have settled in Kenya. The immigrants to present-day Subaland trace their ancestry among Ganda people, Luhya people, [[Busoga|Sogs, and the Luo people. The evidence supporting this is the fact that some Suba groups speak languages similar to Luganda, and the Luhya. The Suba groups tracing ancestry among the Kenyan tribes preceded those groups from Uganda in present-day Subaland and are the numerous and influential ones. Those groups from Uganda are mostly concentrated in Rusinga and Mfangano islands with small pockets of them being found in mainland Kenya. Linguistically, the Suba are highly influenced by the neighbouring Luo, to the point of a language shift having taken place among large portions of the mainland Suba. As a result, their own language has been classified as endangered. Despite this language shift, the Suba have kept a distinct ethnic identity. The Rusinga Festival is held in December of every year as a cultural festival to celebrate and preserve Suba culture and language.

A community cultural festival known as Rusinga Island Cultural, Religious and Arts Festival popularly known as RICRAF is an annual community event which celebrates the cultural heritage of the indigenous Abasuba peoples of Rusinga Island, celebrates the island's archeological significance and gives the islanders a platform to showcase cultural arts and industry. 

The Abagirango (Suna Girango) is another group that is usually erroneously grouped together with the Abasuba of Suba South and Suba North, since they also call themselves Abasuba. But, this is because Girango had a son named Musuba (Suba) and this Musuba had many children than his other brothers, for instance, Tegi and Gire hence descendants of Musuba calling themselves Abasuba meaning Musuba's people. Suba clans in Suna include Simbete, Sweta, and Wiga; and they have a clear and distinct ancestry that goes back to forefathers who crossed red Sea from Misri as illustrated below:

Ragwe<--Siora<--Montheya<--Girango<--Musubaabs

Their language is also distinct and very different from the Olusuba language spoken by the Abasuba of Homa Bay County. The Suna people speak the Ekisuba/Egesuba language which is the same language spoken by their brothers the Suba people (Tanzania).  Currently, those who claim to speak Ekisuba actually speak igikuria (bunchari dialect) which is the same language as the Ekisuba/Egesuba spare the name difference.

General Information
There are also people in Tanzania (Tarime, Musoma and Rorya Districts, Mara Region) who call themselves Suba, and are part of the Abagirango since their language and cultural heritage is the same.

The Suba people who settled on the islands include smaller clans called the Eluzinga or'Chula', meaning the people of the islands. This group includes the following clans: Waware, Awakiwanga (Kaswanga), Wanyama, Waregi, Awamasengere (Kamasengere), Wasaki and Awangoze (Ngodhe), while others were called the Awibuang'ano/Awaivuang'ano (Mfangano/Fang'ano). This group includes Wakula, Wasamo, Wagimbe, Wiramba who are related to Awakiimba (Kakiimba), Awisokolwa and Waozi. Other groups also poured into Mfangano due to the pressure from advancing Luos in Central Nyanza especially in areas around Imbo Naya. They settled in Mfangano and they include; Wayokia, Wakisasi/Awakisori, Wakiara/Wakiala. Others include Kamreri, Kayanja and Waondo who are found in Mirunda Gembe Suba North. Other clans began forming when the people did much more expansion onto the islands. For example, there are other clans whose clan names were distinguished by their new geographic location.

The clan that predominantly lives the closest to Lake Victoria and is the bigger of the sub groups is the people that go by the name Awigassi or Gwasii and they happen to reside upon the Gwasii Hills, Gwassi and Wakula are related since their forefathers Kiboye and Witewe were brothers before escaping to the east after a revolt in the Bagandan Kingdom in the year 1700. Waware were also involved in this struggle. Other groups that reside on a hill are the Uregi who reside on the Uregi Hills of Meari which is a town in the Nyanza province as well as Awangoe residing in the Ungoe Hills. The Awakune or Kaksingri clan live along the lake from Gingo to a small fishing village called Sindo to Ragwe and Ngeri, and they are closely related with Uregi who live in the Uregi Hills since their forefathers came from the same home.  Today many people in the islands and the highlands subsequent to Lake Victoria still retain the original Suba dialect that is the Olusuba that is closely related to the Ganda language, and Lusoga although it is heavily influenced by the bigger Dholuo and Kuria in some areas through interaction. As a result of that interaction, the Olusuba has borrowed a significant amount of lexical items from Dholuo and Kuria that were absent in the original Luganda-like Olusuba dialect.

Further information upon the tribesmen's expansion remained unclear pretty unclear considering that the Niger-Congo family has the largest number of dialects within Africa. Distinguishing the different dialects become rather difficult because they all predominantly use the noun class system. With that being said it has become rather unclear as to how deep into Kenya the Suba people managed to travel being as distinguishing them from other dialects becomes harder and harder as the language is slowly being influenced by its neighboring language, Luo. Suba scholars have taken the initiative to rewrite the History and more information is now available.

Other Suba speakers are found in the Southern shores of the Lake in Muhuru Bay. They are generally called Muhuhuru People and they also speak the Suba language. Some pockets of Uregi, Gwassi, and Kaksingri are also found in Muhuru Bay in Migori county.

Even the greater Suna people who based in Migori county usually identify themselves as Suba and are linguistically and culturally distinct and are unconnected to the Abasuba from Suba district. The Suna people are a heterogeneous group that comprises Luo and splinter tribes from the Kuria. The Suna have however integrated clans originally part of the Olusuba speaking Suba such as Waware, Wiga and Kaswanga into their various sub-groups. The Suna people are the Abagirango or Girango people who call themselves Abasuba because Girango had a son named Musuba (Suba) and not because they are related to the Olusuba speaking Suba of Homa Bay County who are descended of migrants from Buganda and Busoga that entered Kenya through Rusinga and Mfangano Islands by boats.

However, the correct name for the Suna people is ABAGIRANGO although they are referenced as Suna/Suba-Girango to distinguish them from the Olusuba speaking Suba of Homa Bay County who are distinct in terms of heritage from the Abagirango. The term Suba was originally used by Luos to refer to splinter tribes from their main tribes of Kisii, Kuria and Luhya and the term later became the name of the Olusuba speaking people of Homa Bay County who migrated from Uganda escaping the expansion of the Buganda Kingdom. They settled in Kenya as refugees and they had a well formed and a very organised language, political system and economic activities. The Suba in Suna Migori County, Kenya refers to a heterogeneous people of Luo, and Kuria. A clear evidence of this is a town named Suba Kuria in Migori County, Kenya. The Suna Abasuba include the Wasweta (Kadika, Katiga, Kakrao,), Wasimbete (Bahiri kiberi, Bahiri ng'ong'o, bahiri Nkena, Miaro, Nchogu) and Wiga (Wakwena, Nyasasi, Wanje, Nyathocho, Kamsuru).

Their original language is Ekisuba/Egesuba which has several dialects such as sweta, simbiti, surwa, kine, etc. Currently, they speak a language that includes a combination of Kisuba and Egikuria language – that is the bunchari dialect, and many of the communities interact freely with the Suba people in Tanzania (Surwa, Sweta, Simbiti, Hacha, Nguruimi, Kine etc.) and the Kuria (Rianchoka, Banchari, Batimbaru etc.) people. Clans of Suna people; Wasweta, Kadika, Wiga, Wanje, Katiga, Kakaeta, Kanyameda, Wasimbete, Wakwera, Wanyara, Kamn'go'ngo

2010.

Culture

The culture of the Suba People is very distinct from those of the Luo. The Suba people practice circumcision as an initiation process from boyhood to adulthood. Mostly boys are circumcised. In some clans, even girls are circumcised. Suna Girango circumcision process is very similar to their neighbors the kuria even the saro names, for instance, Nginaro, Misungu, Gitang'osa, Kirina, etc.

Clans had roles assigned to them such as circumcision, animals sacrifices and dispute settlements.

Subas were also involved in rain Making sacrifices such as animal sacrifices to appease the gods and clan spirits called Emisambwa singular Omusambwa in Suba District. These were carried out in special shrines which can still be found across Suba such as Utende, Kwitutu, Mungusa and Kiboye Shrines. Subas also revered snakes such as the Python and they believed that Clan spirit dwelled amongst them. An example is given of the spirit of Gumba in Rusinga and Mungusa of Kaksingri.

Dowry included 30heads of Cattle but this also depends upon the purity of the lady to be married. A lady with a child would attract lower number of heads of cattle. Her age mates would accompany her with songs to her new home and celebrate. Alcohol made from Sorghum and Cassava was served as a form of celebration. Ladies also decorated their tummy with special drawings.

During funerals there were gifted elders who would carry Engawvo a type of shield and a long spear and Chant around the homestead while adorned with twigs.

Suba people also practiced rock art as witnessed in the caves of Kwitone in Gulwe Mfangano.

The Suba people are cattle farmers- a culture that they borrowed from the Luos. Even though the Luo no longer keep large herds of cattle, the Suba still keep cattle in large numbers. This is especially common in Migori District in Suba west division where cattle rustling between Kurians and Girango people is common. Subas also loved sport fishing where there was a special species they went for.
The Abasuba also commonly practice polygamy, some of the members of the clan are named to have had even ten wives.

Language Barrier
One of the biggest issues relating to the Suba language declination is the sole fact that Kenya viewed the language as inferior. The education system is teaching English and Luo to the newer generations of Suba children thus impairing the possibilities of the language to come back. Some even say that the fluent language speakers are middle-aged and have yet to establish a system to rebuild the language so that it may take proper footing as one of Africa's many languages, thus it has established a language status of at risk. Many blame the elders as they do not take proper measures to ensure the language's existence by teaching their young ones from an early onset. The biggest concern deriving from the pressures of reviving the language is the fear that their children will begin to build an identity crisis while attending school, considering that it is taught in either English or Luo.

Other than the Rusinga Festival, one of the most recent efforts to preserve the dying language has been the production of a Bible in Suba. Efforts to translate the Bible into Suba started as early as 1988, but it was only completed in 2011.

Notable Suba leaders 

 Tom Mboya
 Kevin Ochieng Okumu: Baba Ella and T. Future C.Sakwa Kanyagwala MCA, Awendo MP, Migori Senator  or Governor. 
 MP John Mbadi
 Philip Ochieng'
 Mzee Ochola Gaha
 Journalist & Commentator Seth Odongo Disembe
 MP Millie Grace Akoth Odhiambo Mabona
John Henry Okwanyo; Long time mp for Migori and served as a cabinet in Kenyatta's and Moi's government. Also contributed a lot to the development of Migori.
 Senator S.F. Onyango Mbeo
 Ambassador Michael George Okeyo
Dr.DO Abade
Jacob Boaz Muoga: Educationist and Social Entrepreneur -Mombasa
Honorable Omondi Caroli (Suba South MP)

Further reading
 Silvery, Ochola Gaa. 2015 'In Search of the Abasuba Identity 'African People 
 Jenkins, Orville Boyd. (January 1997). The Suba of Kenya and Tanzania—A Cultural Profile. (n.d.). http://strategyleader.org/profiles/suba.html
Johnson, Steven L.  1980  'Production, Exchange, and Economic Development Among the Luo-Abasuba of Southwestern Kenya.' Unpublished PhD Dissertation, Department of Anthropology, Indiana University.
Johnson, Steven L. 1983  'Social Investment in a Developing Economy: Position-holding in Western Kenya.' Human Organization 42(4): 340–46.
Johnson, Steven L. 1979  'Changing Patterns of Maize Utilization in Western Kenya.' Studies in Third World Societies 8: 37–56.
Johnson, Steven L.  1988  'Ideological Dimensions of Peasant Persistence in Western Kenya.' in New Perspectives on Social Class and Socioeconomic Development in the Periphery,' ed. 
Joshua Project. Suba in Kenya. (n.d.). http://joshuaproject.net/people_groups/15098/KE#geography
Nelson W. Keith & Novell Zett Keith, New York: Greenwood Press.
News From Africa. (April 2002). Languages: Living on borrowed time. (n.d.). http://www.newsfromafrica.org/newsfromafrica/articles/art_7865.html
Okoth-Okombo, Duncan (1999) 'Language and ethnic identity: the case of the Abasuba', Kenya Journal of Sciences (Series C, Humanities and Social Sciences) 5, 1, 21–38.
 Heine, Bernd & Brenzinger, Mathias (eds.) (2003) 'Africa', in UNESCO Red Book of Endangered Languages. (Suba entry)
Otieno Apiyo Caspar-Nursing and public health student Kenyatta University 2012–2016- Tujifunze Lugha yetu (TLY) a book written in Abasuba and translated in Kiswahili.
Otieno, Jeff. (November 2010). Extinction of languages in East Africa worries Unesco. (n.d.). https://www.theeastafrican.co.ke/magazine/-/434746/1056140/-/item/1/-/ttugthz/-/index.html
Shetler, Jan Bender. (September 2010). Historical memory as a foundation for peace: Network formation and ethnic identity in North Mara, Tanzania. (n.d.). http://jpr.sagepub.com/content/47/5/639.abstract

See also
Rusinga Cultural Festival
Tom Mboya
Luo people of Kenya and Tanzania
Baganda

References

General references
Amadi Allela student at the Technical University of Kenya. www.twitter.com/allela_amadi

External links
Did you know Suba is at risk? (n.d.). http://www.endangeredlanguages.com/lang/4789

Ethnic groups in Kenya